Tifelt (Berber: Tifelt, ⵜⵉⴼⴻⵍⵜ, erroneously rendered as Tiflet in French; Arabic: تيفلت) is a town in northwestern Morocco, west of Khemisset and east of Rabat.  Tifelt is in a region of Morocco that is rich with ancient history including settlement by Berbers, Phoenicians and Romans during the first millennium BC. The nearest such major settlements are in Rabat and Volubilis. Tifelt is between the cities of Rabat and Khemisset

Tifelt is a town that was served by workers of the United States Peace Corps until the attack on America of September 11, 2001. The Peace Corps workers had been assisting local women in a beekeeping cooperative, until the U.S. government evacuated the Peace Corps personnel for concerns over their safety.  Peace Corps workers have since returned and now focus primarily on job skills workshops and English language classes.

See also
Rabat-Fes expressway
Volubilis

References

Populated places in Khémisset Province